Rafael Alves Bastos (born March 17, 1982) is a Brazilian footballer that previously plays for Persib Bandung in the Indonesia Super League.

References

External links

1982 births
Association football forwards
Brazilian expatriate footballers
Brazilian expatriate sportspeople in Indonesia
Expatriate footballers in Indonesia
Liga 1 (Indonesia) players
Living people
Persib Bandung players
America Football Club (RJ) players
Footballers from Rio de Janeiro (city)
Brazilian footballers